The IOF .22 revolver is a .22 caliber revolver made by the Indian Ordnance Factory in 2002. The revolver's cylinder can hold 8 cartridges and has a single-action and double-action trigger.

References

External links
 

Revolvers of India
.22 LR revolvers